The Eames Lounge Chair and ottoman are furnishings made of molded plywood and leather, designed by Charles and Ray Eames for the Herman Miller furniture company. They are officially titled Eames Lounge (670) and Ottoman (671) and were released in 1956 after years of development by designers. It was the first chair that the Eameses designed for a high-end market. Examples of these furnishings are part of the permanent collection of New York's Museum of Modern Art.

Design
Charles and Ray Eames sought to develop furniture that could be mass-produced and affordable, with the exception of the Eames Lounge Chair. This luxury item was inspired by the traditional English club chair. The Eames Lounge Chair is an icon of Modern style design, although when it was first made, Ray Eames remarked in a letter to Charles that the chair looked "comfortable and un-designy". Charles's vision was for a chair with "the warm, receptive look of a well-used first baseman's mitt." The chair is composed of three curved plywood shells covered with veneer: the headrest, the backrest and the seat. The layers are glued together and shaped under heat and pressure. The shells and the seat cushions are essentially of the same shape, and composed of two curved forms interlocking to form a solid mass. The chair back and headrest are identical in proportion, as are the seat and the ottoman.

The products have changed in various ways over time. Beginning in 1956 and running through the very early 1990s, the shells were made up of five thin layers of plywood which were covered by a veneer of Brazilian rosewood. The use of Brazilian rosewood was discontinued in the early 1990s, and current production since then consists of seven layers of plywood covered by finishing veneers of cherry, walnut, palisander rosewood (a sustainably grown wood with similar grain patterns to the original Brazilian versions), and other finishes. Small changes include the sets of spacers between the aluminum spines and the wood panels, originally of rubber, later hard plastic washers, and the number of screws securing the armrests, originally three, changed to two in second-series models, while the "domes of silence" (glides/feet) on the chair base originally had thinner screws attaching them to the aluminum base than those on later chairs, and the zipper around the cushions, either brown or black on early models, was later black only. Further, early ottomans had removable rubber slide-on feet with metal glides. Labels to denote authenticity have changed over the decades with the very first in 1956 a silver/white circular medallion containing the phrases 'designed by Charles Eames' and 'Herman Miller Zeeland Mich', changing to black oblong ('70s and '80s), silver oblong ('90s and 2000s), and curved embossed (2000s–present).

History
The Eames Lounge Chair first appeared on the Arlene Francis Home show broadcast on the NBC television network in the US in 1956. Immediately following the debut, Herman Miller launched an advertising campaign that highlighted the versatility of the chair. Print ads depicted the 670 in a Victorian parlor, occupied by a grandmother shelling peas on the front porch of an American Gothic style house, and in the middle of a sunny field of hay.

Since its introduction, the chair has been in continuous production by MillerKnoll in the USA. Later, Vitra (in cooperation with the German furniture company Fritz Becker KG) began producing the chair for the European market. It was licensed in the UK for 10 years to Hille International LTD from 1957. Immediately following its release, other furniture companies began to copy the chair's design. Some made direct copies, others were merely influenced by the design. The former Plycraft Company issued dozens of chairs that were direct copies of or in-the-style-of the Eames 670. Later Chinese and European companies began making direct copies. However, Herman Miller and Vitra remain the only two companies to produce these chairs with the Eames name attached.

In 2006, to commemorate the 50th anniversary of the chair, Miller released models using a sustainable palisander rosewood veneer. In 2008 both Herman Miller & Vitra developed a tall (known as XL in Europe) version offering a higher and wider sizing.

Popular culture
 Frasier features the chair and ottoman in the apartment of the titular character, Frasier Crane, who identifies it by name in the pilot episode and describes it in a later episode as "...the best-engineered chair in the world." Like most of the furnishings, it is there for the entire series.
 Shark Tank replaced its red chairs it had for eight seasons with Eames Lounge Chairs as part of a new, modern set.
 iCarly also featured the chair and sometimes ottoman in the Seattle apartment of Carly Shay and her brother Spencer.  Both Frasier and iCarly were set in Seattle.
 House features the chair and ottoman in Dr. House's office, across from his desk.
 Things I Miss the Most song by Steely Dan mentions "the comfy Eames chair" in the lyric of the second chorus.
 The chair and ottoman appear in the cover of the 8th volume of the Spy × Family manga series used by character Franky.

On display
 A 1956 rosewood Eames Lounge Chair and ottoman are in the permanent collection of the Museum of Modern Art in New York City. The set was a gift of the Herman Miller Company, donated in 1960.
 A rosewood Eames Lounge Chair and ottoman are on display at the Henry Ford Museum in Dearborn, Michigan.
 A walnut or rosewood Eames Lounge Chair and ottoman are on display and in the permanent collection of the Museum of Fine Arts Boston.

See also
 Eames Lounge Chair Wood
 Chaise longue

References

Further reading

External links
Herman Miller product page
Eames Office - vintage
California Academy of Sciences - Science in Action - Episode 379 - The Chair - guest Charles Eames (March 14, 1960)
Eames Lounge Chair Generation Guide 1956 - Present

Chairs
Works by Charles and Ray Eames
History of furniture
Modernism
Individual models of furniture
1956 works